Alfredo Faget (1 July 1923 – 18 July 2003) was a Cuban basketball player. He competed in the men's tournament at the 1948 Summer Olympics and the 1952 Summer Olympics.

References

1923 births
2003 deaths
Basketball players at the 1948 Summer Olympics
Basketball players at the 1952 Summer Olympics
Cuban men's basketball players
Olympic basketball players of Cuba
People from Guaynabo, Puerto Rico
Place of birth missing